Marc López and Gabriel Trujillo-Soler were the defending champions. Trujillo-Soler chose to not participate this year and López partnered up with Leonardo Azzaro. They lost to Rameez Junaid and Philipp Marx in the second round.
Junaid and Marx won in the final 6–4, 6–3, against Jesse Huta Galung and Rui Machado.

Seeds

Draw

Draw

References
 Doubles Draw

Status Athens Open - Doubles
2009 Doubles